The Chongqing Library, initially called the National Roosevelt Library, is a large-scale comprehensive public library, located in Shapingba District, Chongqing City, China. The library was established in 1947, and was one of only five national libraries in China at the time. It is one of the two earliest United Nations document depositories in China.

In 1947, the National Roosevelt Library,  the predecessor of the Chongqing Library, was established  to commemorate former U.S. President Franklin D. Roosevelt's contributions to China's resistance to Japanese aggression and the anti-fascist victory in World War II.

On May 27, 2021, the Culture Officer of the U.S embassy in China, and the Economic Officer of the U.S. Embassy in China, with a delegation group, visited Chongqing Children's Library, also known as "Former Site of Roosevelt Library," to discuss the future direction of cooperation in culture and tourism between Chongqing and the United States.

References

Franklin D. Roosevelt
Libraries in China
Buildings and structures in Chongqing
Libraries established in 1947
1947 establishments in China